Bey-sur-Seille (literally Bey on Seille) is a commune in the Meurthe-et-Moselle department in northeastern France. Bey-sur-Seille has a population (as of 2018) of 174.

Population

See also
Communes of the Meurthe-et-Moselle department

References

Communes of Meurthe-et-Moselle